Snøhetta Dome is a dome-shaped elevation which is snow-covered except for a few rock exposures, situated  east of Hornet Peak in the Ahlmann Ridge of Queen Maud Land. It was mapped by Norwegian cartographers from surveys and air photos by the Norwegian-British-Swedish Antarctic Expedition (1949–52) and air photos by the Norwegian expedition of 1958–59, and named Snøhetta ("the snow cap").

References

Hills of Queen Maud Land
Princess Martha Coast